Towanda is a city in Butler County, Kansas, United States.  As of the 2020 census, the population of the city was 1,447.

History
Towanda was established in 1870 and incorporated in 1905. Towanda is an Osage-language name meaning "big village".

An F4 tornado devastated the town on March 31, 1892, killing at least nine people and injuring 60.

21st century
In 2010, the Keystone-Cushing Pipeline (Phase II) was constructed a few blocks west of Towanda (immediately west of SW River Valley Rd), running north to south through Butler County. With much controversy over tax exemption and environmental concerns (if a leak ever occurs).

Geography
Towanda is located at  (37.795921, -96.999380), along the Whitewater River.

Demographics

2010 census
As of the census of 2010, there were 1,450 people, 524 households, and 397 families living in the city. The racial makeup of the city was 95.3% White, 0.3% African American, 1.1% Native American, 0.5% Asian, 0.4% Pacific Islander, 0.5% from other races, and 1.9% from two or more races. Hispanic or Latino of any race were 2.7% of the population.

There were 524 households, of which 39.9% had children under the age of 18 living with them, 59.9% were married couples living together, 9.4% had a female householder with no husband present, 6.5% had a male householder with no wife present, and 24.2% were non-families. 20.4% of all households were made up of individuals, and 7.2% had someone living alone who was 65 years of age or older. The average household size was 2.77 and the average family size was 3.15.

The median age in the city was 34.5 years. 30% of residents were under the age of 18; 8.9% were between the ages of 18 and 24; 24.4% were from 25 to 44; 25.1% were from 45 to 64; and 11.7% were 65 years of age or older. The gender makeup of the city was 50.0% male and 50.0% female.

2000 census
As of the census of 2000, there were 1,338 people, 492 households, and 383 families living in the city. The racial makeup of the city was 96.79% White, 0.37% African American, 0.37% Native American, 0.22% Asian, 0.22% from other races, and 2.02% from two or more races. Hispanic or Latino of any race were 0.75% of the population.

There were 492 households, out of which 39.2% had children under the age of 18 living with them, 66.1% were married couples living together, 8.3% had a female householder with no husband present, and 22.0% were non-families. 20.7% of all households were made up of individuals, and 8.1% had someone living alone who was 65 years of age or older. The average household size was 2.72 and the average family size was 3.14.

In the city, the population was spread out, with 29.3% under the age of 18, 9.2% from 18 to 24, 29.0% from 25 to 44, 20.5% from 45 to 64, and 12.0% who were 65 years of age or older. The median age was 34 years. For every 100 females, there were 96.2 males. For every 100 females age 18 and over, there were 92.7 males.

The median income for a household in the city was $41,875, and the median income for a family was $47,188. Males had a median income of $32,250 versus $24,167 for females. The per capita income for the city was $17,815. About 5.1% of families and 6.5% of the population were below the poverty line, including 9.0% of those under age 18 and 5.0% of those ages 65 or over.

Education
The community is served by Circle USD 375 public school district.

Circle High School, located in Towanda, has one of the top graphic arts departments in the state. They are the top computer art school recognized at the Scholastics Art and Writing Awards, since 2005. The Circle High School mascot is the Thunderbirds.

Notable people

 Garner E. Shriver, U.S. Representative from Kansas
 Jordan Phillips, defensive lineman for the Arizona Cardinals

See also
 National Register of Historic Places listings in Butler County, Kansas
 Towanda Masonic Lodge No. 30 A.F. and A.M.

References

Further reading

External links

 City website
 Towanda - Directory of Public Officials
 Towanda City Map, KDOT

Cities in Kansas
Cities in Butler County, Kansas
Wichita, KS Metropolitan Statistical Area
1870 establishments in Kansas
Populated places established in 1870